Johann Ernst "Hansi" Hinterseer (born 2 February 1954) is an Austrian singer, actor, entertainer and former alpine skier.

Sports career
Hinterseer is the son of Ernst Hinterseer, who won a gold medal in slalom skiing at the 1960 Winter Olympics. Hans Hinterseer also became a member of the Austrian ski team. He won six alpine skiing World Cup races in the slalom and giant slalom, and the overall giant slalom contest at the 1973 Alpine Skiing World Cup. He also won the silver medal at the world championship in 1974, and participated at the 1976 Winter Olympics in Innsbruck.

Since the early 1980s, he has been a technical sports commentator for the National Austrian Broadcasting Corporation, usually commenting on slalom and giant slalom live broadcasts.

Individual races

Music and acting career

In 1994, he started a career as a singer, and is currently prominent as a performer in the schlager genre. He has also acted in several films, also following a Heimatfilm theme.

Discography 
Charting albums

Charting singles

Others
 Wenn man sich lieb hat ("If you are in love")
 Ich warte auf Dich ("I am waiting for you")
 Mein Geschenk für Dich ("My present for you")
 Danke für deine Liebe ("Thank you for your love")
 Dann nehm ich dich in meine Arme ("Then I take you in my arms")
 Träum´mit mir ("Dream with me")
 Du bist alles ("You are everything")
 Weihnachten mit Hansi ("Christmas with Hansi")
 Vater, dein Wille geschehe ("Father, thy will be done")
 Meine Lieder, Deine Träume ("My songs, your dreams")
 Goldene Weihnacht ("Golden Christmas")
 Komm mit mir ("Come with Me") (2009, Ariola)

DVDs
 2010: Ich hab dich einfach lieb! Kitzbühel Open Air 2010

TV / Filmography
 1997: "Hochwürdens Ärger mit dem Paradies" (TV film comedy)
 2000: "Da wo die Berge sind"
 2002: "Da wo die Liebe wohnt" 
 2003: "Da wo die Heimat ist"
 2004: "Da wo die Herzen schlagen"
 2005: "Da wo das Glück wartet"

References

External links 

 Official homepage
 

1954 births
Living people
Austrian male alpine skiers
Olympic alpine skiers of Austria
Alpine skiers at the 1976 Winter Olympics
Austrian male musicians
Schlager musicians
Austrian male television actors
Sportspeople from Tyrol (state)
FIS Alpine Ski World Cup champions
Austrian male film actors
Recipients of the Decoration of Honour for Services to the Republic of Austria